Pollia fumosa, common name : the smoky goblet, is a species of sea snail, a marine gastropod mollusk in the family Pisaniidae.

Description
The shell size varies between 20 mm and 40 mm

Distribution
This species is distributed in the Red Sea, the Indian Ocean along Chagos, Madagascar, the Mascarene Basin and Tanzania and the Western Pacific Ocean.

References

 Dautzenberg, Ph. (1929). Mollusques testaces marins de Madagascar. Faune des Colonies Francaises, Tome III
 Drivas, J.; Jay, M. (1987). Coquillages de La Réunion et de l'Île Maurice. Collection Les Beautés de la Nature. Delachaux et Niestlé: Neuchâtel. . 159 pp.
 Vine, P. (1986). Red Sea Invertebrates. Immel Publishing, London. 224 pp.
 Richmond, M. (Ed.) (1997). A guide to the seashores of Eastern Africa and the Western Indian Ocean islands. Sida/Department for Research Cooperation, SAREC: Stockholm, Sweden. . 448 pp.
 Liu J.Y. [Ruiyu] (ed.). (2008). Checklist of marine biota of China seas. China Science Press. 1267 pp

External links
 

Pisaniidae
Gastropods described in 1817